DiNucci, Dinucci is an Italian surname. Notable people with the surname include:

Ben DiNucci (born 1996), American football player
Darcy DiNucci, author, web designer, and expert in user experience
Kiko Dinucci

See also
Nucci

Italian-language surnames